The 34th International Emmy Awards took place on November 20, 2006 in New York City and hosted by Irish comedian Graham Norton. The award ceremony, presented by the International Academy of Television Arts and Sciences (IATAS), honors all programming produced and originally aired outside the United States.

Ceremony 
The nominees for the 34th International Emmy Awards were announced by the International Academy of Television Arts and Sciences (IATAS) on October 9, 2006, at a press conference at MIPCOM in Cannes, France.

United Kingdom received the most nominations, managing to place 17 out of 36 selected programs in all 9 categories. Followed by Brazil and Germany with five each. The nominees were selected over six months by a panel of 500 judges representing 35 countries.

Two special awards were presented by the International Academy, director Steven Spielberg was honored with the Founders' Award for his television career. The Directorate Award went to Ronald S. Lauder, founder and director of CME (Central European Media Enterprises), for his pioneering independent television broadcasting in Central and Eastern Europe. UNICEF Goodwill Ambassador Susan Sarandon presented an award for children’s broadcasting, Ecaterina Telescu accepted the International Children’s Day of Broadcasting (ICDB) Award on behalf of TeleRadio-Moldova. The other five nominees up for the honour came from Bangladesh, Colombia, Gambia, Spain and Syria.

Winners

Most major nominations 
By country
 — 17
 — 5
 — 5
 — 3
 — 2

By network
BBC — 8
Channel 4 — 7
Rede Globo — 3
GmbH — 2
HBO Latin America — 2
NRK — 2
ZDF — 2

Most major awards 
By country
 — 6

By network
BBC — 4
Channel 4 — 2

References

External links 
 International Academy of Television Arts & Sciences Official website

International Emmy Awards ceremonies
2006 television awards
2006 in American television